Ulugqat Township (ئۇلۇغچات يېزىسى ) is a township of Ulugqat County (Wuqia) in Kizilsu Kyrgyz Autonomous Prefecture, Xinjiang Uygur Autonomous Region, China. Located in the middle north of the county, the township covers an area of 3,430 square kilometers with a population of 4,430 (as of 2017). It has 4 villages under its jurisdiction. Its seat is at Korgan Village .

Ulugqat Township is located 92 kilometers west of the county seat Wuqia Town. It is adjacent to Kiziloy Township in the east, Oksalur Township in the south and Jigin Township in the west, and borders with the Kyrgyz Republic in the north with a boundary line of 118 kilometers. There are 9 mountain passes connecting Kyrgyzstan.

Name
The name of Ulugqat  is from the Kyrgyz language, meaning  branch valleys. It is named after that the Kizilsu Valley divides into two separate branch valleys in the area and the place presents the shape of the three mountain valleys.

History

Ulugqat Township is commonly known as old Wuqia. Ulugqat Township was once the seat of Ulugqat branch county established from Shufu County in 1913. Ulugqat branch county was changed to Ulugqat Division  in 1929 and the county of Wuqia was established from Ulugqat Division in 1938 and the county seat was transferred to Wuqia Town.

Ulugqat was part of the 2nd district of Wuqia County in 1950. Ulugqat Commune  was formed in 1958. The commune was renamed to Dongfeng Commune  in 1968 and restored the former name in 1980. The commune was reorganized as a township in 1984.

Subdivisions
The township has 4 villages and 8  unincorporated villages under its jurisdiction.

 Korgan Village (Ku'ergan, Ku'ergancun) 
 Kizilkuru Village (Kezilekulu)
 Qongterak Village (Qiongtiereke, Qiongtie Rekecun) 
 Sarakbay Village (Sarekebayi, Sare Kebayicun)

Demographics

, the population of Ulugqat was Kyrgyz.

Economy
Ulugqat's economy is primarily based on animal husbandry.

Protected animals in Ulugqat include argali, goitered gazelle, and snowcock.

References 

Township-level divisions of Wuqia County